{{Speciesbox
| genus = Pseudodictamnus 
| species = undulatus
| authority = (Benth.) Salmaki & Siadati
| synonyms = 
 Ballota undulata (Sieber ex Fresen.) Benth.
 Marrubium crispum Sieber ex Boiss.
 Marrubium undulatum Sieber ex Fresen. 	
}}Pseudodictamnus undulatus, commonly known as common ballota or horehound, is a species of flowering plant in the family Lamiaceae, native to the Mediterranean region including Egypt, Israel and Jordan. It is a compact, evergreen subshrub with a woody base, many hairy wiry stems, simple opposite leaves with toothed margins, and whorls of white flowers with funnel-shaped calyxes.

It is a plant of semi-arid, acidic stony habitats and in Israel often grows in association with Echinops gaillardotii, Carlina corymbosa and Ziziphus lotus''.

References

undulata
Plants described in 1834
Flora of Egypt
Flora of Israel
Flora of Jordan
Flora of Palestine (region)
Flora of the Mediterranean Basin